Edward James Allsopp (born 15 August 1926) was Australia's leading male race walker in the 1950s. He set his personal best (4:20.00) in the men's 50 km in 1966. He was born in Edenhope, Victoria.

Achievements

References
Ted Allsopp's profile at Sports Reference.com
Profile

1926 births
Living people
Australian male racewalkers
Athletes (track and field) at the 1956 Summer Olympics
Athletes (track and field) at the 1964 Summer Olympics
Olympic athletes of Australia